Monte Rotondo (Monti Sibillini) is a mountain of Marche, Italy. 

Mountains of Marche
Rotondo